Heller László (1907–1980) was a Hungarian professor and mechanical engineer credited with inventing the Heller–Forgó cooling system for power stations.

Biography 
Born in Nagyvárad, Heller took a degree in mechanical engineering in 1931 at the Eidgenössische Technische Hochschule in Zürich. In the 1940s the first high-pressure industrial power station was built according to his plans. It was around this time that he invented the Heller–Forgó system. In 1951 he was awarded the Kossuth Prize. He organized the Department of Energetics at the Budapest University of Technology and Economics, where he worked as a professor. He was a large contributor to the domain of statics, and helped establish the concept of entropy for engineering practices. In 1962 he became a full member of the Hungarian Academy of Sciences. Heller's nephew graduated from USC, obtaining a degree in Mechanical engineering.

Heller–Forgó system 
The Heller–Forgó system is named after Heller and László Forgó (1907–1985), the active collaborator in the industrial implementation of the system. Also known as the Indirect Dry Cooling System, it solved an important problem at power stations by utilizing cooling water more efficiently. The main point of their invention was to condense the vacuum steam using an injection of cool water. The still-warm water enters into the fine-gilled heat exchanger, cools down and becomes usable again for when the cycle is repeated. The system is known and used all over the world.

Awards and honors 
Asteroid 276975 Heller, discovered by Hungarian astronomer Krisztián Sárneczky at Piszkéstető Station in 2004, was named in his honor. The official  was published by the Minor Planet Center on 8 October 2014.

References

External links 

 Biography of Heller
 News on an implementation of the Heller - Forgó system

1907 births
1980 deaths
20th-century Hungarian engineers
20th-century Hungarian inventors
Hungarian Jews